The 200th Battalion, CEF was a unit in the Canadian Expeditionary Force during the First World War.  Based in Winnipeg, Manitoba, the unit began recruiting during the winter of 1915/16 in that city.  After sailing to England in May 1917, the battalion was absorbed into the 11th Reserve Battalion on May 14, 1917.  The 200th Battalion, CEF had one Officer Commanding: Lieut-Col. A. L. Bonnycastle.

References
Meek, John F. Over the Top! The Canadian Infantry in the First World War. Orangeville, Ont.: The Author, 1971.

Battalions of the Canadian Expeditionary Force
Military units and formations of Manitoba